St. Joseph High School is a co-educational, private Roman Catholic college preparatory high school in Victoria, Texas, USA.  It is located in the Roman Catholic Diocese of Victoria in Texas.

Background
St. Joseph High School is a private Catholic school governed by an independent Board of Directors. STJ was founded in 1868 by Reverend Augustine Gardet as a school to educate young men. In 1906 the Society of Mary assumed operation of the school. In 1970 St. Joseph High School became under the supervision of the Sisters of the Incarnate Word and Blessed Sacrament. At this time the school entered into the sharing of faculty and facilities with Nazareth Academy, a school for young women. In 1975 STJ became a co-educational high school.

Notes and references

External links
 School Website
 Diocese of Victoria, Texas

Catholic secondary schools in Texas
Buildings and structures in Victoria, Texas
Educational institutions established in 1868
Schools in Victoria County, Texas
1868 establishments in Texas